Geospatial is an adjective, which pertains to data and information identified with a specific geographical location.

Geospatial may also refer to:

 Geospatial analysis
 Geospatial imagery
 Geospatial intelligence
 Geospatial technology

See also
 Geospace